The Grand Trunk station was a historic railroad station in Mechanic Falls, Maine. The station, located on Elm Street, was built in 1883 by the Grand Trunk Railroad linking Mechanic Falls with Montreal and Portland, Maine. The village was named Mechanic Falls in honor of mechanics who worked there during the industrial revolution. The village grew especially after the arrival of the St. Lawrence & Atlantic Railroad toward the end of 1840. The railroad opened the village to several business ventures between Portland and Montreal.

After the cessation of rail services at the station in 1965, it was demolished in 1968. Only the storage depot survived, and is now inhabited as a residence.

Gallery

See also 
 Grand Trunk railway stations, other stations of Grand Trunk Railway and its subsidiaries

References

External links

Railway stations in the United States opened in 1883
Former railway stations in Maine
Mechanic Falls, Maine
Mechanic Falls, Maine
Transportation buildings and structures in Androscoggin County, Maine